Plays for England was the title of a double-bill of plays written, performed and published by John Osborne, released by Evans Brothers Limited in London in 1962. It comprised The Blood of the Bambergs and Under Plain Cover.

Plays
The Blood of the Bambergs, subtitled “A Fairy Story,” was originally performed on 19 June 1962 at the Royal Court Theatre, directed by John Dexter.
Under Plain Cover was originally performed on 19 June 1962 at the Royal Court Theatre, directed by Jonathan Miller.

References

Plays by John Osborne
1962 plays